This is a list of Foreign Ministers of Nicaragua from 1937 to the present day.

1937–1940: Manuel Cordero Reyes
1940–1946: Mariano Argüello Vargas
1946–1948: Víctor Manuel Román y Reyes
1948–1949: Luis Manuel Debayle Sacasa
1949–1956: Óscar Sevilla Sacasa
1957–1961: Alejandro Montiel Argüello
1961–1962: René Schick Gutiérrez
1962–1967: Alfonso Ortega Urbina
1967–1972: Lorenzo Guerrero Gutiérrez
1972–1977: Alejandro Montiel Argüello
1977–1979: Julio C. Quintana Villanueva
1979............ Harry Bodán Shields
1979–1990: Miguel d'Escoto Brockmann
1990–1992: Enrique Dreyfus Morales
1992–1997: Ernesto Leal Sanchez
1997–1998: Emilio Álvarez Montalván
1998–2000: Eduardo Montealegre Rivas
2000........... José Adán Guerra Pastora 
2000–2002: Francisco Xavier Aguirre Sacasa
2002–2007: Norman Jose Caldera Cardenal
2007–2017: Samuel Santos López
2017–present:

Sources
Rulers.org – Foreign ministers L–R

Foreign
Foreign Ministers
Politicians
Foreign Ministers of Nicaragua
Nicaragua